Beautiful Life is the eighth studio album by English singer and songwriter Rick Astley. It was released on 13 July 2018 by BMG. The album peaked at number 6 on the UK Albums Chart.

Background
On 1 June 2018, Astley posted a video on Twitter announcing his upcoming album Beautiful Life set for release on 20 July. Beautiful Life ended up being released earlier than previously said, with its release date on 13 July 2018. Talking about the album, Astley said, "In the midst of all this madness, I just went back into my little home studio because that's what I love to do. It's my refuge really. I was tinkering about with bits and pieces and before you know it, I was making a new record."

Singles
"Beautiful Life" was released as the lead single from the album on 1 June 2018. "Empty Heart" was released as the second single from the album on 6 July 2018. "Try" was released as the third single from the album on 23 August 2018. "She Makes Me" was released as the fourth single from the album on 9 November 2018.

Commercial performance
Beautiful Life debuted at number 6 on the UK Albums Chart. It became Astley's fifth top ten album in the United Kingdom. In Germany, the album debuted at number 40 on the German Albums Chart. The album has also charted in Austria, Belgium and Switzerland.

Track listing

Charts

Release history

References

External links
Official Website

2018 albums
Rick Astley albums